The greywacke zone is a band of Paleozoic metamorphosed sedimentary rocks that forms an east-west band through the Austrian Alps.

The greywacke zone crops out between the Mesozoic rocks of the Northern Calcareous Alps and the Austroalpine and Penninic basement rocks of the Central Eastern Alps. The zone is part of the Austroalpine nappes.

Mesozoic limestones crop out north of the greywacke zone, forming the Northern Calcareous Alps. South of the zone, basement rocks of the Austroalpine and Penninic nappes form the Central Eastern Alps.

Composition
The lithologies of the greywacke zone are:
Paleozoic turbidites (among them greywackes) and limestones of Ordovician to Devonian age; and
felsic and mafic volcanic rocks of Ordovician age.

Formation
The rocks were formed at a passive margin of the Paleo-Tethys Ocean, when the Austroalpine terrain was part of the micro-continent Avalonia. Together with the other Austroalpine units, they were thrust over the European plate during the Alpine orogeny.

References

 
Geology of the Alps
Geology of Austria